USMA may refer to:

 United States Military Academy, a four-year federal service academy in West Point, New York
 Universidad Católica Santa María La Antigua, a private university in Panama City, Panama
 US Metric Association, a non-profit organization that advocates for total conversion of the United States to the International System of Units
 USM Alger, a football club based in the city of Algiers